The ninth season of the reality television series Love & Hip Hop: New York aired on VH1 from November 26, 2018 until March 18, 2019. The show was primarily filmed in New York City, New York. It is executively produced by Mona Scott-Young, Stephanie Gayle and Treiva Williams for Monami Entertainment, Toby Barraud, Stefan Springman, David DiGangi, Dave Patry, Richard Allen and Meredith Kisgen for Eastern TV, and Nina L. Diaz, Liz Fine and Vivian Gomez for VH1.

The series chronicles the lives of several women and men in the New York area, involved in hip hop music. It consists of 16 episodes, including a two-part reunion special hosted by Nina Parker.

Production
Season nine of Love & Hip Hop: New York began filming in June 2018.

On September 27, 2018, VH1 announced the show's return for a ninth season, which will premiere on November 26, 2018. After a four year hiatus, it was announced that Cyn Santana and Joe Budden would return to the show in season nine, along with Kimbella and Juelz Santana, with rapper Maino joining the cast. On November 5, 2018, VH1 released a teaser with the season's tagline "the comeback season begins", confirming that Rich Dollaz, after appearing as a supporting cast member in every season prior, had finally been promoted to main cast, along with Budden, Papoose, Juelz and Safaree. The three couples  – Remy and Papoose, Joe and Cyn, Kimbella and Juelz  – are credited together in the opening credits. Mariahlynn, Anaís and Nya Lee would return to the show as supporting cast members, along with Maino, his girlfriend Maggie Carrie, Love & Hip Hop: Hollywoods Alexis Skyy and transgender rapper Sidney Starr. 

The season's promotional videos would all follow a nostalgic, old school aesthetic, with more of a focus on the show's couples and "O.G." cast members than ever before. On November 13, 2018, VH1 began releasing interviews with Yandy, Rich, Remy and Safaree, looking back on their time on the show. On November 19, 2018, VH1 released a five-minute supertrailer. On November 21, 2018, VH1 released a five-minute sneak peek from the season's premiere episode.

The season would be accompanied by an official podcast, Love & Hip Hop: The Tea, hosted by Jesse Janedy, TK Trinidad and Lem Gonsalves.

Synopsis

Cast

Starring
 Remy Ma (8 episodes)
 Papoose (8 episodes)
 Joe Budden (14 episodes)
 Cyn Santana (15 episodes)
 Kimbella Vanderhee (13 episodes)
 Juelz Santana (11 episodes)
 Yandy Smith-Harris (12 episodes)
 Rich Dollaz (11 episodes)
 Juju C. (10 episodes)
 Safaree Samuels (9 episodes)

Also starring
 Alexis Skyy (10 episodes)
 Maino (10 episodes)
 Jaquáe (9 episodes)
 Jonathan Fernandez (11 episodes)
 Anaís (4 episodes)
 Sidney Starr (9 episodes)
 Nya Lee (10 episodes)
 Maggie Carrie (9 episodes)
 Kiyanne (1 episode)
 Mariahlynn (7 episodes)
 DJ Self (1 episode)
 Judy Harris (1 episode)

Navarro Gray and Ashley Trowers return in guest roles. Yandy's foster daughter Infinity Gilyard, Juelz's mother Deborah James and Ashley's mother Miracle Kaye Hall appear as guest stars in several episodes. Mendeecees Harris appears via phone call conversations with Yandy, as he was incarcerated during filming. The show also features minor appearances from notable figures within the hip hop industry and New York's social scene, including Shotti, Fetty Wap, The Joe Budden Podcasts Rory & Mal, Anaís' husband Ruben Brito, Danny García, Joe's mother Fay Southerland, Couple Therapys Dr. Jenn Mann, Rich's mother Jewel Escobar and Love & Hip Hop: Hollywoods Solo Lucci.

Episodes

Webisodes

Check Yourself
Love & Hip Hop New York: Check Yourself, which features the cast's reactions to each episode, was released weekly with every episode on digital platforms.

Bonus scenes
Deleted scenes from the season's episodes were released weekly as bonus content on VH1's official website.

References

External links

2018 American television seasons
2019 American television seasons
Love & Hip Hop